Mario Arqués Blasco (born 14 January 1992) is a Spanish footballer who plays as a midfielder who plays for Malaysia Super League club Kelantan.

Club career
Arqués was born in Alicante, Valencia. A product of Villarreal CF's youth system, he made his senior debuts while on loan at Orihuela CF in the 2011–12 campaign, in Segunda División B.

On Arqués moved to another reserve team, Valencia CF Mestalla also in the third level. He featured regularly for the side under the course of two seasons, being also an unused substitute in a 1–1 Copa del Rey home draw against Real Madrid on 23 January 2013.

On 22 July 2014 Arqués signed a two-year deal with neighbouring Elche CF, being assigned to the B-team in the same division. He made his first team – and La Liga – debut on 25 April 2015, replacing Pedro Mosquera in the 85th minute of a 0–3 away loss against Atlético Madrid.

Sporting de Gijon B

On 18 August 2015 Arqués joined Sporting de Gijón B, also in the third division.

CD Alcoyano

The following 9 August, he moved to fellow league team CD Alcoyano.

Jamshedpur FC

On 3 September 2018, Arqués joined the Indian Super League side Jamshedpur FC.

Kerala Blasters

On 29 May 2019, Mario Arqués joined the Indian Super League club Kerala Blasters.

Kelantan FC

On 14 February 2021, Mario Arqués joined the Malaysian Premier League club Kelantan FC. On 7 March 2021, he made his league debut for Kelantan FC in 0 - 1 loss against Perak FC II.

Newcastle Jets 
On 13 October 2021, Arqués joined A-League Men club Newcastle Jets.

Sông Lam Nghệ An 
On 12 August 2022, Arqués joined V.League 1 club Song Lam Nghe An. He played 7 games and had 1 goal, 2 assists.

Hai Phong FC 
On 01 January 2023, Arqués joined Hai Phong FC in V.League 1 for a season.

Career statistics

References

External links

1992 births
Living people
Footballers from Alicante
Spanish footballers
Association football midfielders
Malaysia Premier League players
Kelantan F.C. players
La Liga players
Segunda División B players
Orihuela CF players
Valencia CF Mestalla footballers
Elche CF Ilicitano footballers
Elche CF players
Sporting de Gijón B players
CD Alcoyano footballers
Ukrainian Premier League players
FC Karpaty Lviv players
Indian Super League players
Jamshedpur FC players
Newcastle Jets FC players
Spanish expatriate footballers
Expatriate footballers in Ukraine
Expatriate footballers in India
Spanish expatriate sportspeople in Ukraine
Spanish expatriate sportspeople in India
Kerala Blasters FC players